Seipin is a protein that in humans is encoded by the BSCL2 gene.

Clinical significance 
It can be associated with Congenital generalized lipodystrophy type 2 .

References

External links
 GeneReviews/NCBI/NIH/UW entry on BSCL2-Related Neurologic Disorders/Seipinopathy

Further reading